Gamasellus is a genus of mites in the family Ologamasidae. There are more than 60 described species in Gamasellus.

Species
These 69 species belong to the genus Gamasellus:

 Gamasellus acutus Karg, 1997
 Gamasellus alexandrovae Davydova, 1982
 Gamasellus alpinus Schweizer, 1949
 Gamasellus bellavistae Emberson, 1967
 Gamasellus borealis (Koch, 1879)
 Gamasellus caucasicus Bregetova & Troitsky, 1981
 Gamasellus changbaiensis Bei & Yin, 1995
 Gamasellus concinus (Womersley, 1942)
 Gamasellus cooperi (Womersley, 1961)
 Gamasellus cophinus Lee, 1973
 Gamasellus davydovae Vinnik, 1993
 Gamasellus deepdalensis (Ryke, 1962)
 Gamasellus discutatus (Lee, 1966)
 Gamasellus dunhuaensis Ma, 2003
 Gamasellus exiquns Davydova, 1982
 Gamasellus ezoensis Ishikawa, 1983
 Gamasellus falciger (Canestrini &  Canestrini, 1881)
 Gamasellus falculatus Athias-Henriot, 1961
 Gamasellus grishinae Davydova, 1982
 Gamasellus grossi Lee, 1973
 Gamasellus heteropilus (Karg, 1977)
 Gamasellus humosus Ishikawa, 1969
 Gamasellus kurilensis Bregetova & Troitsky, 1981
 Gamasellus lanceolatus Liang & Ishikawa, 1989
 Gamasellus lativentralis Ishikawa, 1983
 Gamasellus leggetti (Ryke, 1962)
 Gamasellus litoprothrix (Lee, 1966)
 Gamasellus morogoroensis Hurlbutt, 1979
 Gamasellus muscosus Hurlbutt, 1979
 Gamasellus nivalis Schweizer, 1949
 Gamasellus orientalis Davydova, 1982
 Gamasellus peninsularis Ishikawa, 1976
 Gamasellus plumatilis Karg, 1993
 Gamasellus plumosus Ishikawa, 1983
 Gamasellus puberulus Davydova, 1982
 Gamasellus pulcherimus Davydova, 1982
 Gamasellus pyriformis Berlese, 1916
 Gamasellus quartornatus Karg, 1997
 Gamasellus quintornatus Karg, 1996
 Gamasellus radicolus (Karg, 1977)
 Gamasellus robustipes Berlese, 1908
 Gamasellus sexornatus Karg, 1997
 Gamasellus shcherbakae Davydova, 1982
 Gamasellus shongweniensis (Ryke, 1962)
 Gamasellus silvaticus Davydova, 1982
 Gamasellus silvestris Halašková, 1958
 Gamasellus simpliciseta Liang & Ishikawa, 1989
 Gamasellus southcotti (Lee, 1966)
 Gamasellus spiricornis (Canestrini &  Canestrini, 1882)
 Gamasellus sternopunctatus Vinnik, 1993
 Gamasellus taeniatus Davydova, 1982
 Gamasellus tasmanicus (Womersley, 1956)
 Gamasellus tengkuofani (Bai, Yan & Wei, 2010)
 Gamasellus tianmuensis Liang & Ishikawa, 1989
 Gamasellus tindalei (Lee, 1966)
 Gamasellus tragardhi (Womersley, 1942)
 Gamasellus tschucotensis Davydova, 1982
 Gamasellus tundriensis Davydova, 1982
 Gamasellus tuvinycus Davydova, 1982
 Gamasellus uluguruensis Hurlbutt, 1979
 Gamasellus venustus Ishikawa, 1983
 Gamasellus vibrissatus Emberson, 1967
 Gamasellus villosus Davydova, 1982
 Gamasellus virgosus (Lee, 1966)
 Gamasellus virguncula (Lee, 1973)
 Gamasellus volkovi Davydova, 1982
 Gamasellus xini Liang & Ishikawa, 1989
 Gamasellus yastrebtsovi Vinnik, 1993
 Gamasellus yosiianus Ishikawa, 1999

References

 
Ologamasidae